Thliptoceras bicuspidatum is a moth in the family Crambidae. It was described by Zhang in 2014. It is found in Guangdong, China.

The wingspan is about 28 mm. The forewings are pale grey fuscous with fuscous markings. The hindwings are translucent whitish at the base and along the costa.

Etymology
The species name refers to the valva with two pointed processes at the distal end is derived from Latin bicuspidatus (meaning two pointed).

References

Pyraustinae
Moths described in 2014